10 Lekë (10 L) have a value of 10 Albanian lek.

References

Currencies of Albania
Ten-base-unit coins